St Matthew's is a Church of England parish church, located in St. Petersburgh Place, Bayswater, London, near the New West End Synagogue and Greek Orthodox Cathedral of Saint Sophia. It is a Grade II* listed building, executed in the Victorian Gothic revival style.

History
The church was built in 1880, by London-born architect John Johnson (1843 – 1919). Some of the stained glass is probably by Morris & Co. The organ is by J. W. Walker & Sons Ltd. The church, in Victorian Gothic Revival style, was funded by John Derby Allcroft of Stokesay Court in Shropshire, one of several London churches he financed. It was completed in 1882, replacing the earlier Bayswater Chapel constructed in 1818. A large congregation flocked to hear the incumbent, Archdeacon James Hunter, who had recently returned from  missionary work with the Cree of Canada.

Present day
The parish continues to use the Book of Common Prayer (BCP) at most of its services, rather than the modern Common Worship.

Notable people
 Rennie MacInnes,  Bishop of Jerusalem, was a curate from 1896 to 1899.
 Sidney Nowell Rostron, formerly Principal of St John's College, Durham, was vicar from 1922 to 1933.
 Hugh Gough, subsequently Archbishop of Sydney and Primate of Australia, was vicar from 1939 to 1946.
 Edward John Bolus was a deacon in 1926.

Gallery

References

External links

Bayswater
Grade II* listed churches in the City of Westminster
19th-century Church of England church buildings
Diocese of London
Bayswater